The Diocese of Norwich is a diocese of the Church of England in Norfolk, UK

Diocese of Norwich may also refer to:

the Roman Catholic Diocese of Norwich, Connecticut, USA

See also
Roman Catholic Diocese of East Anglia, diocese based in Norwich, Norfolk